Stefano Giliati (born October 7, 1987) is a Canadian-born Italian professional ice hockey left wing who plays currently for the Fort Wayne Komets in the ECHL.

Playing career
Giliati played major junior hockey in the Quebec Major Junior Hockey League with the Shawinigan Cataractes and the Lewiston MAINEiacs.

Originally signed as a free agent by the Toronto Maple Leafs, on August 27, 2010, Giliati was traded by the Maple Leafs (along with Alex Berry) to the Tampa Bay Lightning in exchange for Matt Lashoff.

At the conclusion of his entry-level contract, and released as a free agent by the Lightning, Giliati opted to pursue a career abroad in signing with Italian club, HC Bolzano of the Serie A. Of Italian heritage, Giliati spent a single season with HCB in Italy, helping claim the Italian Championship, before leaving for the Finnish Liiga with SaiPa. After two seasons with SaiPa, Giliati transferred to fellow Finnish club, Espoo Blues on a one-year contract on April 28, 2014. Giliati scored his first goal for Blues on September 20, 2014 in a 5-4 away loss to Oulun Kärpät.

On July 13, 2015, Giliati left Finland as a free agent to sign a two-year deal with Croatian-based KHL entrant, KHL Medveščak Zagreb. He left Zagreb after one year and headed to Switzerland, where he played in three games for HC Davos of the National League A (NLA) at the beginning of the 2016-17 campaign. In October 2016, he transferred to the Schwenninger Wild Wings of the German top-flight Deutsche Eishockey Liga (DEL).

In his third season with the Wild Wings in 2018–19 and with the club well out of playoff contention, Giliati left in the final season of his contract to sign for the remainder of the year with Swiss outfit, the SCL Tigers of the NL, on February 7, 2019.

After 11 European seasons, Giliati opted to return to North America in agreeing to a one-year contract with the Fort Wayne Komets of the ECHL for the 2022–23 season on July 21, 2022.

Career statistics

Regular season and playoffs

International

References

External links

1987 births
Living people
Asiago Hockey 1935 players
Bolzano HC players
Canadian ice hockey forwards
Canadian people of Italian descent
HC Davos players
Espoo Blues players
Fort Wayne Komets players
Lewiston Maineiacs players
KHL Medveščak Zagreb players
Norfolk Admirals players
Reading Royals players
SaiPa players
SaPKo players
Schwenninger Wild Wings players
SCL Tigers players
Shawinigan Cataractes players
Ice hockey people from Montreal
Toronto Marlies players
Canadian expatriate ice hockey players in Croatia
Canadian expatriate ice hockey players in Italy
Canadian expatriate ice hockey players in Finland
Canadian expatriate ice hockey players in Germany
Canadian expatriate ice hockey players in Switzerland